Mason is an incorporated town in Effingham County, Illinois, United States. The population was 345 at the 2010 census, down from 396 at the 2000 census. It was named after Roswell Mason, an official of the Illinois Central Railroad. Mason is part of the Effingham, IL Micropolitan Statistical Area.

Geography
Mason is located in southern Effingham County at  (38.952398, -88.626490). Illinois Route 37 passes through the town, leading northeast  to Watson and southwest  to Edgewood. Interstate 57 crosses the northwest corner of Mason, but the closest access is from Edgewood to the southwest or from Exit 151  to the northeast.

Demographics

As of the census of 2000, there were 396 people, 147 households, and 103 families residing in the town. The racial makeup of the town was 98.23% White, 0.25% Native American, 0.76% from other races, and 0.76% from two or more races. Hispanic or Latino of any race were 2.27% of the population.

There were 147 households, out of which 34.0% had children under the age of 18 living with them, 60.5% were married couples living together, 4.1% had a female householder with no husband present, and 29.3% were non-families. 25.9% of all households were made up of individuals, and 14.3% had someone living alone who was 65 years of age or older.  The average household size was 2.69 and the average family size was 3.15.

In the town, the population was spread out, with 28.3% under the age of 18, 4.8% from 18 to 24, 33.6% from 25 to 44, 22.7% from 45 to 64, and 10.6% who were 65 years of age or older.  The median age was 35 years. For every 100 females, there were 118.8 males.  For every 100 females age 18 and over, there were 107.3 males.

The median income for a household in the town was $40,441, and the median income for a family was $41,797. Males had a median income of $26,607 versus $18,333 for females. The per capita income for the town was $13,392.  About 5.9% of families and 6.1% of the population were below the poverty line, including 4.2% of those under age 18 and 17.1% of those age 65 or over.

Notable people 

 Lowell Bayles, air race pilot
 Ada Kepley, author and first American woman to graduate law school, owned a farm in Mason township
 Mason Ruffner, singer, songwriter, musician

References

1865 establishments in Illinois
Populated places established in 1865
Towns in Effingham County, Illinois
Towns in Illinois